Peter Lawrence Strauss (born February 20, 1947) is an American television and film actor, known for his roles in several television miniseries in the 1970s and 1980s. He is a five-time Golden Globe Awards nominee.

Early life
Strauss was born in Croton-on-Hudson, New York, the son of Warren B. Strauss, a German-born wine importer. His family was Jewish. Strauss graduated from the Hackley School in 1965 and Northwestern University in 1969.

Career
He won an Emmy Award for his role on the 1979 made-for-television movie The Jericho Mile, and he starred in a television remake of the classic 1946 film Angel on My Shoulder in 1980. In 1985, he played Abel Roznovski in the miniseries Kane & Abel based on Jeffrey Archer's book. His other noted television miniseries credits include starring roles in Rich Man, Poor Man, its sequel Rich Man, Poor Man Book II, and Masada.  Strauss played Joseph P. Kennedy Jr. in the 1977 TV movie Young Joe, the Forgotten Kennedy. In 1973, he portrayed Stephen Linder, Mary Richards' suave younger boyfriend in The Mary Tyler Moore Show fourth-season episode, "Angels in the Snow."

Strauss starred in the films Soldier Blue (1970) and Spacehunter: Adventures in the Forbidden Zone (1983), and has appeared in several others. He portrayed Justin, the Rats of NIMH's captain of the guard, in 1982's The Secret of NIMH. Strauss starred as an abused husband in the television movie Men Don't Tell, alongside Judith Light. In 2005, he played the U.S. President in the thriller XXX: State of the Union alongside Ice Cube, Samuel L. Jackson, Scott Speedman and Willem Dafoe. He was the voice of Moses in the animated series K10C: Kids' Ten Commandments. He starred in the short-lived series Body & Soul as Dr. Isaac Braun in 2002. He provided the voice for Stoker Van Rotten in both the 1990s and 2006 versions of Biker Mice from Mars.

Personal life
Strauss married Rachel Ticotin on December 31, 1998. Strauss runs a successful citrus production business and is on the advisory board of the Los Angeles County Arboretum and Botanic Garden. He sold a ranch property to the Santa Monica Mountains Conservancy. The ranch has since been acquired by the National Park Service as the Peter Strauss Ranch.

Filmography

References

Demetria Fulton; preview of Peter Strauss in Barnaby Jones; episode “The Last Contract”(12/31/1974).

External links

1947 births
Living people
American male film actors
American people of German-Jewish descent
American male television actors
American male voice actors
Jewish American male actors
Outstanding Performance by a Lead Actor in a Miniseries or Movie Primetime Emmy Award winners
Male actors from New York (state)
People from Croton-on-Hudson, New York
Northwestern University School of Communication alumni
20th-century American male actors
21st-century American male actors
21st-century American Jews